2 Samuel 9 is the ninth chapter of the Second Book of Samuel in the Old Testament of the Christian Bible or the second part of Books of Samuel in the Hebrew Bible. According to Jewish tradition the book was attributed to the prophet Samuel, with additions by the prophets Gad and Nathan, but modern scholars view it as a composition of a number of independent texts of various ages from c. 630–540 BCE. This chapter contains the account of David's reign in Jerusalem. This is within a section comprising 2 Samuel 9–20 and continued to 1 Kings 1–2 which deal with the power struggles among David's sons to succeed David's throne until 'the kingdom was established in the hand of Solomon' (1 Kings 2:46).

Text
This chapter was originally written in the Hebrew language. It is divided into 13 verses.

Textual witnesses
Some early manuscripts containing the text of this chapter in Hebrew are of the Masoretic Text tradition, which includes the Codex Cairensis (895), Aleppo Codex (10th century), and Codex Leningradensis (1008). Fragments containing parts of this chapter in Hebrew were found among the Dead Sea Scrolls including 4Q51 (4QSam; 100–50 BCE) with extant verses 8–10. 

Extant ancient manuscripts of a translation into Koine Greek known as the Septuagint (originally was made in the last few centuries BCE) include Codex Vaticanus (B; B; 4th century) and Codex Alexandrinus (A; A; 5th century).

Analysis
The structure of this chapter is as follows:
A. David's intention (9:1)
B. David speaks to Ziba (9:2–5)
C. Mephibosheth does obeisance (9:6)
 D. David fulfills his covenant with Jonathan (9:7)
C'. Mephibosheth does obeisance (9:8)
B'. David speaks to Ziba (9:9–11)
A'. David's intention is accomplished (9:12–13)

This chapter is connected with events concerning the house of Saul and the death of Ishbosheth in 2 Samuel 2–4, but more strongly with the story of the Gibeonites' revenge in 2 Samuel 21:1–14, which should precede the accommodation of Mephibosheth at David's table.

David inquires about the house of Saul (9:1–4)
The section begins with David asking about 'showing kindness to the house of Saul for Jonathan's sake' (verse 1), which is based on his promises to Jonathan in their covenant before YHWH and his promise to Saul that he 'would not cut off his descendants'. The passage contains a flashback to a time early in David's reign (c. 999 BCE according to Steinmann), placed in this chapter in anticipation of the events in 1 Samuel 16 and 1 Samuel 19 concerning Ziba and Mephibosheth. David did not have much information about Saul's house since his escape from that house (c. 1015 BCE), whereas his last contact with Jonathan was at Horesh (1 Samuel 23:16–18; c. 1013–1012 BCE) about one year after Mephibosheth's birth. David's official knew about Saul's servant, Ziba, who had the information about Saul's descendants (verse 2). Ziba only identified Mephibosheth as the surviving member of the house of Saul, because Saul's sons from concubines and the grandsons through his daughter Merab (cf. 2 Samuel 21:8) were not considered heirs to Saul's house.

Verse 1
And David said, "Is there still anyone left of the house of Saul, that I may show him kindness for Jonathan's sake?"
"Kindness": in the sense of "covenant faithfulness".

David and Mephibosheth (9:5–13)

David granted Mephibosheth son of Jonathan special patronage (verse 7), at royal expense (v. 11), his grandfather's property restored to him (verse 7) and arrangements were made for Ziba to act as estate manager to provide for the family (verse 10). 

Saul's estate (verse 7) was a crown property, so it should belong to David after he became king, but at that time some may also be still the property of remaining members in Saul's house, including his children of concubines, relatives and the family of his daughters. Merab, Saul's oldest daughter, was with her husband, Adriel, in Meholah (1 Samuel 14:49; 18:17–19), whereas Michal, Saul's other daughter, resided with her husband, king David, in Jerusalem (2 Samuel 6:16–23), so some lands in other areas may have been maintained by caretakers, including Ziba. This could be how David's officials were able to trace Ziba. Now David could declare that all the estate should be given to Mephibosheth as Saul's sole legitimate heir. 

Verse 5Then King David sent and brought him out of the house of Machir the son of Ammiel, from Lo Debar.''
"Machir": a valued member in Saul's house who later also showed kindness to David during Absalom's rebellion (1 Samuel 17:27–29).

See also

Related Bible parts: 1 Samuel 20, 1 Samuel 24, 2 Samuel 16, 2 Samuel 19

Notes

References

Sources

Commentaries on Samuel

General

External links
 Jewish translations:
 Samuel II - II Samuel - Chapter 9 (Judaica Press). Hebrew text and English translation [with Rashi's commentary] at Chabad.org
 Christian translations:
 Online Bible at GospelHall.org (ESV, KJV, Darby, American Standard Version, Bible in Basic English)
 2 Samuel chapter 9. Bible Gateway

09